Anthony Barton Goble (20 October 1943 – 13 April 2007) was a Welsh artist.

Goble was born in Newtown, Montgomeryshire into a wealthy family. His father's death when he was a baby resulted in him spending his early years in the care of a Welsh speaking family. He was later reunited with his mother and elder sisters, who had moved to Llandudno. He was educated at St Mary's College, Rhos-on-Sea and Wrexham College of Art. He married in 1963 and settled at Llanfairfechan. He worked at several jobs to support his family while trying to make his name as an artist.

Goble became a member of the Royal Cambrian Academy in 1977, before taking on a residency at Llanover Hall arts centre in Cardiff in 1979. His work has been exhibited at the Royal Academy of Arts and the National Portrait Gallery, London as well as a 25-year retrospective at Llanover Hall in 2004.

Works by Tony Goble are exhibited in the collections at the National Museum of Wales, Leeds Museum, the Glynn Vivian Art Gallery and the Contemporary Art Society for Wales.

Solo exhibitions
"Dream-Seeds", Glynn Vivian Art Gallery, Swansea, 1995
"25 Years in Residence", Llanover Hall, 2004

References

1943 births
2007 deaths
Members of The Welsh Group
People from Newtown, Powys
20th-century Welsh male artists
21st-century Welsh male artists